Treasures of Greyhawk is an adventure module for the Dungeons & Dragons fantasy roleplaying game, set in the game's World of Greyhawk campaign setting.

Plot summary
As the name of the module implies, each of these mini-adventures is designed to focus on a unique treasure in the World of Greyhawk. Such treasures include the Helm of Selnor, the Eye of Nyr Dyv, the Face of Xenous, and the Sword of Azor'alq..

List of adventures

Publication history
The module was published by TSR, Inc. in 1992 for the second edition Advanced Dungeons & Dragons. It bears the code "WGR2" and contains 19 short adventures set in various locations throughout the World of Greyhawk. The storylines of the adventures are loosely connected. During the various adventures in the book, players can, for example, explore the home of the archmage Bigby, invade a dragon's lair, travel to the demiplane called The Great Maze of Zagyg, and trade riddles with a sphinx.

Reception
Keith H. Eisenbeis reviewed the module in the March/April issue of White Wolf magazine. He stated that anyone could find use in it and that "This product is certainly worth buying for those who run Greyhawk campaigns and can be fairly easily adapted to other similar campaign worlds such as the Forgotten Realms." He rated it as a 3 out of a possible 5.

References

External links
 Treasures of Greyhawk at the TSR Archive
 World of Greyhawk Reference Series at the Acaeum.com

Greyhawk modules
Role-playing game supplements introduced in 1992